National Tertiary Route 332, or just Route 332 (or ) is a National Road Route of Costa Rica, located in the San José province.

Description
In San José province the route covers Pérez Zeledón canton (Pejibaye, La Amistad districts).

References

Highways in Costa Rica